Pickens County Courthouse may refer to:

Pickens County Courthouse (Alabama), Carrollton, Alabama
Pickens County Courthouse (Georgia), Jasper, Georgia
Pickens County Courthouse (South Carolina) Pickens, South Carolina